The second season of the Brazilian competitive reality television series MasterChef Profissionais premiered on September 5, 2017, at 10:30 p.m. on Band.

Chef Pablo Oazen won the competition over chef Francisco Pinheiro on December 5, 2017.

Contestants

Top 16

Elimination table

: Francisco won the Mystery Box challenge and advanced directly to next week, alongside Raissa who was the challenge's top entry. Guilherme, Lubyanka and Pablo were selected as the bottom entries and were not eligible to compete in the mini-challenge where the winner would guarantee an extra immunity. Irina won the challenge and also advanced, leaving eight contestants to compete in the Elimination Test.

Key

Ratings and reception

Brazilian ratings
All numbers are in points and provided by Kantar Ibope Media.

 In 2017, each point represents 245.700 households in 15 market cities in Brazil (70.500 households in São Paulo)
Note: Episode 2 aired against the season premiere of A Fazenda: Nova Chance.
Note: Episode 6 aired against a special episode of telenovela A Força do Querer.
Note: Episode 14 aired against a special 'The Battles' episode of The Voice Brasil.

References

External links
 MasterChef Profissionais on Band
 

2017 Brazilian television seasons
MasterChef (Brazilian TV series)